R. Prasannan (September 20, 1929 – August 19, 2008) was an Indian academic, commissioner and a Malayalam author.

He received his initial education in Kerala -  B.L. and LL.M. degrees  from Kerala University, followed by LL.M. and Ph.D. (Law) from Yale University, USA.

Prasannan held the following posts:
Professor and Dean, Post-Graduate Studies in Law, Kerala and Calicut University
Secretary, Kerala Legislative Assembly from 6.11.1969 - 27.4.1984
Member, Kerala Public Men ( Prevention of Corruption) Commission
Member, Kerala Backward Classes Commission
Commissioner, Sree Narayana Trust ( Government Appointment)
Member, National Commission for Backward Classes from 05.9.93 to 04.8.96

Prasannan authored eight books in Malayalam. Most notable is "Niyamasabhayil Nishabthanaaye" (Niyamasabhayil niśśabdanāyi) for which he received the 'Sahodharan Ayyappan' Award. He has also authored several magazine and journal articles in English and Malayalam.

See also 
 List of Indian writers

References 

1929 births
People from Kerala
Yale Law School alumni
2002 deaths